Vicia graminea is a species of flowering plant in the vetch genus Vicia, family Fabaceae. It is native to South America, where it has a meandering distribution in Colombia, Peru, Bolivia, Paraguay, northeast Argentina, southern Brazil, Uruguay, and southern Chile. It is the source for a lectin that is used to identify the N blood group antigen.

Subtaxa
The following subtaxa are accepted:
Vicia graminea var. graminea – entire range
Vicia graminea var. nigricarpa  – southern Brazil
Vicia graminea var. transiens  – northeast Argentina, Uruguay

References

graminea
Flora of Colombia
Flora of Peru
Flora of Bolivia
Flora of Paraguay
Flora of Northeast Argentina
Flora of South Brazil
Flora of Uruguay
Flora of southern Chile
Plants described in 1818